The Legenda Hartviciana or Vita Hartviciana, also anglicized as the Life of King Stephen of Hungary by Hartvic, is the official hagiography of St. Stephen, the first King of Hungary. It was compiled by Hartvik, the bishop of Győr during the reign of Coloman the Book-lover at the turn of the 11th and 12th centuries, based on the holy king's two earlier hagiographies (Legenda maior and Legenda minor). Beside the veneration of Stephen I, the work served the actual political purposes of Coloman against the Holy See. Pope Innocent III sanctioned the Legenda Hartviciana as the official hagiography of Stephen I of Hungary in 1201.

References

Sources

Primary sources

 "Hartvic, Life of King Stephen of Hungary" (Translated by Nora Berend) (2001). In Head, Thomas. Medieval Hagiography: An Anthology. Routledge. pp. 378–398. .

Secondary sources

 
 
 
 
 
 
 
 
 
 

Christian hagiography
Medieval documents of Hungary
Hungarian legends
1100s works